John Joseph Doyle (October 25, 1869 – December 31, 1958) was an Irish born first baseman in Major League Baseball whose career spanned 17 seasons, mainly in the National League.
He was born in Killorglin, Ireland, and emigrated to the U.S. when he was a child, his family settling in Holyoke, Massachusetts.

Playing career
After attending Fordham University, he embarked on a baseball career that would last 70 years. He made his first appearance at the major league level by signing and playing two years for the Columbus Solons of the American Association. He is credited with being the first pinch-hitter in pro ball, with Cleveland at Brooklyn on June 7, . Patsy Tebeau was the manager and Doyle came through with a game-winning single.

For the  season, he took over the everyday duties at first base and became team captain. Manager John Montgomery Ward not only made the decision to replace his former teammate and friend Roger Connor, but released him as well. Connor was a very popular player, and this decision drew the ire and scrutiny from the fans and media alike. Ward defended his decision and claimed the move came down to the fact that he liked Doyle's playing style, describing him as a hustler. Replacing Connor at first base proved worth the risk, as Jack batted .367 that season, and he totaled 100 runs batted in and stole 42 bases.

Dirty Jack
Because of his aggressive playing style, Doyle was known as "Dirty Jack", often feuding with umpires, fans, opposing players, and even, at times, his own teammates. On one occasion, in Cincinnati on July 4, while in the 3rd inning of the second game of a doubleheader, Doyle slugged umpire Bob Emslie after being called out on a steal attempt. Fans jumped from the stands as the two fought before being chased back by policemen. After players finally separated Doyle from Emslie, he was arrested and fined. On July 1, when he was being harassed by a Polo Grounds fan, he jumped into the stands and hit him once with his left hand, reinjuring it after having broken it several weeks earlier.

He carried on a lengthy feud with John McGraw that started when they were teammates at Baltimore. McGraw, of course, had to have the last word. In , McGraw was appointed manager of the Giants, and his first act was to release Doyle, even though he was batting .301 and fielding .991 at the time.

Minor league success
In 1905, after playing one game with the New York Highlanders, Doyle became manager of Toledo of the Western Association.

Other career capacities
In 1908–09, the only years of his adult life spent outside of baseball, he served as police commissioner of his hometown of Holyoke. In his many years with the Cubs, Doyle was credited with signing or recommending the acquisition of such stars as Gabby Hartnett, Hack Wilson, Billy Herman, Stan Hack, Bill Jurges, Charlie Root, Bill Lee, Augie Galan, Riggs Stephenson and Phil Cavarretta. He remained in that capacity until his death on New Year's Eve 1958 at the age of 89. He was buried at St. Jerome Cemetery in Holyoke.

Honors
In the Irish Baseball League, the annual award for best slugger is named "The 'Dirty' Jack Doyle" Silver Slugger Award.

See also
 List of Major League Baseball career stolen bases leaders
 List of players from Ireland in Major League Baseball
List of Major League Baseball player-managers
List of Major League Baseball single-game hits leaders

References

External links

1869 births
1958 deaths
19th-century baseball players
American police chiefs
Baltimore Orioles (NL) players
Brooklyn Superbas players
Chicago Orphans players
Chicago Cubs scouts
Irish emigrants to the United States (before 1923)
Sportspeople from Holyoke, Massachusetts
Sportspeople from County Kerry
Cleveland Spiders players
Columbus Solons players
Major League Baseball players from Ireland
Irish baseball players
People from Killorglin
Major League Baseball first basemen
New York Giants (NL) players
New York Giants (NL) managers
New York Highlanders players
Philadelphia Phillies players
Washington Senators (NL) managers
Washington Senators (1891–1899) players
Haverhill (minor league baseball) players
Manchester Maroons players
Lynn Shoemakers players
Canton Nadjys players
Toledo Mud Hens players
Des Moines Champs players
Milwaukee Brewers (minor league) managers
Milwaukee Brewers (minor league) players
Fordham Rams baseball coaches
Fordham Rams baseball players
Manhattan Jaspers baseball coaches
Washington Senators (1891–1899) managers
Major League Baseball player-managers